The Shadowhunter Chronicles is a media franchise based on the writings of American young adult fiction writer Cassandra Clare, which currently encompasses six series of novels, three short-story collections, five graphic novels, one film, a television series, and other media.

These works are set in a universe where fairy tales and mythologies, both pagan and Judeo-Christian, exist with its figures existing alongside the mundanes (normal humans). A race of humans who possess angel blood, the Nephilim or Shadowhunters, is organized to patrol the Shadow World and prevent demons as well as Downworlders, including warlocks, faeries, werewolves, and vampires, from attacking the mundanes. There is an uneasy peace, a treaty known as The Accords, between the governing body of the Nephilim, known as the Clave, and the Downworlders, not all of whom want peace or respect the Clave's authority.

Novels
The following books are arranged in order of their respective timelines.

The Infernal Devices

The Infernal Devices is the second set of books published. Set in 1878 in Victorian era London, it revolves around Tessa Gray, a teenager who comes to London following her brother's invitation but ends up thrust into the Shadow World upon learning she is not a mundane but, rather, a warlock variant, warlocks being half-human and half-demon. Tessa is unique even among warlocks, as she is the only known case of having Nephilim heritage. The Nephilim, here textually often referred to as Shadowhunters, are blessed with the blood of the angel, thus making Tessa a fourth seraphic.
 Clockwork Angel (August 31, 2010)
 Clockwork Prince (December 6, 2011)
 Clockwork Princess (March 19, 2013)

The Last Hours

The Last Hours is the fifth set of books to all be published. The sequel to The Infernal Devices series, it is set in 1903 London and Paris and revolves around Tessa's children, James and Lucie, as well as their family friend, Cordelia Carstairs, as they navigate through the politics of the London Enclave.
 Chain of Gold (March 3, 2020)
 Chain of Iron (March 2, 2021)
 Chain of Thorns (January 31, 2023)

The Mortal Instruments

The Mortal Instruments is the first set of books published. The series is mainly set in the year 2007 and revolves around the Shadowhunter Clary Fairchild. She and her friends are confronted with two wars: the first against Valentine Morgenstern, and the second against his son Jonathan Morgenstern.
 City of Bones (March 27, 2007)
 City of Ashes (March 25, 2008)
 City of Glass (March 23, 2009)
 City of Fallen Angels (April 5, 2011)
 City of Lost Souls (May 8, 2012)
 City of Heavenly Fire (May 27, 2014)

The Eldest Curses 
The Eldest Curses is the fourth set of books all to be published. The trilogy tells the story of Magnus Bane and Alec Lightwood's adventures together and explore their relationship. Each book is set at different points in the franchise's timeline: the first is set during the events of The Mortal Instruments; the second is set between the events of The Mortal Instruments and The Dark Artifices; and the last will be set after The Dark Artifices. The books were jointly written by Cassandra Clare and Wesley Chu.

 The Red Scrolls of Magic (April 9, 2019)
 The Lost Book of the White (September 1, 2020)
 The Black Volume of the Dead (TBA)

The Dark Artifices

The Dark Artifices is the third set of books published. The sequel to The Mortal Instruments series, it takes place in 2012, five years after the events of that series's final book, City of Heavenly Fire. It revolves around the Shadowhunter Emma Carstairs, first introduced in City of Heavenly Fire, as she seeks the answer for her parents' mysterious deaths.
 Lady Midnight (March 8, 2016)
 Lord of Shadows (May 23, 2017)
 Queen of Air and Darkness (December 4, 2018)

The Wicked Powers
The Wicked Powers will be the sixth and final set of books to be published and serve as the conclusion of The Shadowhunter Chronicles. It will be based in 2015, three years after the events of the final book of The Dark Artifices - Queen of Air and Darkness - and will centre around the characters of Kit Herondale, Ty Blackthorn and Dru Blackthorn.
 Book 1 (TBA)
 Book 2 (TBA)
 Book 3 (TBA)

Companion books
The following books are listed in order of their publication dates.

 Shadowhunters and Downworlders is a collection of young adult authors writing about the series and its world.  It was released on January 29, 2013.
 The Shadowhunter's Codex is a companion book to The Shadowhunter Chronicles series released on October 29, 2013. It explains the terminology and the lore of the series as well as other extras and special features.
 The Bane Chronicles is an anthology book consisting of eleven novellas revolving around the character Magnus Bane. Ten of the novellas were previously released online in a period of a year and were jointly written by Cassandra Clare and other young-adult writers. It was released on November 11, 2014.
"What Really Happened in Peru" (with Sarah Rees Brennan)
"The Runaway Queen" (with Maureen Johnson)
"Vampires, Scones, and Edmund Herondale" (with Sarah Rees Brennan)
"The Midnight Heir" (with Sarah Rees Brennan)
"The Rise of the Hotel Dumort" (with Maureen Johnson)
"Saving Raphael Santiago" (with Sarah Rees Brennan)
"The Fall of the Hotel Dumort" (with Maureen Johnson)
"What to Buy the Shadowhunter Who Has Everything" (with Sarah Rees Brennan)
"The Last Stand of the New York Institute" (with Sarah Rees Brennan and Maureen Johnson)
"The Course of True Love (And First Dates)"
 A History of Notable Shadowhunters & Denizens of Downworld: Told in the Language of Flowers is a collection of artwork by Cassandra Jean, who created The Shadowhunter Tarot Cards. Inspired by the Victorian language of flowers, this hardbound volume features characters from The Mortal Instruments, The Infernal Devices, The Dark Artifices, Tales from the Shadowhunter Academy, and The Last Hours, each with a beautifully illustrated portrait and a selection of never before known details and notes about the characters. It was released on February 18, 2016.
 Tales From the Shadowhunter Academy is an anthology book that, like The Bane Chronicles, consists of ten novellas released online in a period of nine months revolving around Simon Lewis, first introduced in The Mortal Instruments as Clary Fairchild's best friend, as he gets the chance to become a Shadowhunter. The anthology was released on November 15, 2016.
"Welcome to Shadowhunter Academy" (with Sarah Rees Brennan)
"The Lost Herondale" (with Robin Wasserman)
"The Whitechapel Fiend" (with Maureen Johnson)
"Nothing but Shadows" (with Sarah Rees Brennan)
"The Evil We Love" (with Robin Wasserman)
"Pale Kings and Princes" (with Robin Wasserman)
"Bitter of Tongue" (with Sarah Rees Brennan)
"The Fiery Trial" (with Maureen Johnson)
"Born to Endless Night" (with Sarah Rees Brennan)
"Angels Twice Descending" (with Robin Wasserman)
 Ghosts of the Shadow Market is a collection of ten novellas, and much like The Bane Chronicles and Tales from the Shadowhunter Academy, it follows the adventures of Jem Carstairs. The first eight were published monthly in e-book format between April and November 2018, and the last two were published exclusively in the print edition that was released on June 4, 2019.
"Son of the Dawn" (with Sarah Rees Brennan)
"Cast Long Shadows" (with Sarah Rees Brennan)
"Every Exquisite Thing" (with Maureen Johnson)
"Learn About Loss" (with Kelly Link)
"A Deeper Love" (with Maureen Johnson)
"The Wicked Ones" (with Robin Wasserman)
"The Land I Lost" (with Sarah Rees Brennan)
"Through Blood, Through Fire" (with Robin Wasserman)
"The Lost World" (with Kelly Link)
"Forever Fallen" (with Sarah Rees Brennan)

Adaptations

Film

In 2010, Screen Gems announced that they were going into production on the film adaptation of City of Bones, the first book in The Mortal Instruments series, with hopes of starting a successful film franchise. The film was originally due for release on August 23, 2013, but was pushed back two days earlier, on August 21, 2013. The film premiered on August 12, 2013, at the Cinerama Dome in Hollywood. Production on a film adaptation of the second book, City of Ashes, was due to start in September 2013, but was delayed to 2014, and eventually cancelled, after the first film failed to recoup its budget.

Television

On October 12, 2014, at Mipcom, Constantin confirmed that The Mortal Instruments will return as a television series with Ed Decter as showrunner. Constantin Film and TV head Martin Moszkowicz told The Hollywood Reporter that, "It actually makes sense to do [the novels] as a TV series. There was so much from the book that we had to leave out of the Mortal Instruments film. In the series we'll be able to go deeper and explore this world in greater detail and depth." The producers hope to adapt the entire book series if the TV adaptation proves successful. In February 2015, book series author Cassandra Clare announced via Twitter that the television series would be called Shadowhunters rather than The Mortal Instruments.

In March 2015, ABC Family picked up Shadowhunters straight-to-series, and premiered on January 12, 2016. The series was renewed for a second season in March 2016, comprising 20 episodes, which premiered on January 2, 2017. In April 2017, it was announced that the series was renewed for a third season of 20 episodes. The first half of ten episodes premiered on March 20, 2018. On June 4, 2018, Freeform canceled the series after three seasons, but ordered two extra episodes to properly conclude the series' story; the second half of the third season premiered on February 25, 2019.

References

External links
 Recommended reading orders of The Shadowhunter Chronicles on Encycla

 
Book series introduced in 2007
Mass media franchises
Young adult novel series
Margaret K. McElderry books